University School of Information, Communication and Technology (formerly University School of Information Technology) is a constituent institute of Guru Gobind Singh Indraprastha University accredited grade 'A' by UGC located in university's main campus at Dwarka Sec-16, Dwarka, Delhi.

Academics

Academic Programmes 

The Institute offers Dual Degree B.Tech/M.Tech ( in CSE, IT and ECE), Master of Technology in Robotics and Automation Engineering the emerging branch of future technologies, Master of Computer Applications ( Software Engineer ), Doctor of Philosophy (PhD).

Admissions

The admission into Dual Degree B.Tech/M.Tech program is taken through the University Counselling portal (ipu.admissions.nic.in) on the basis of All India Rank (CRL) secured in the Joint Entrance Examination- MAINS and university's common entrance test IPU-CET. 

For M.Tech. (Robotics & Automation Engineering) degree, candidate can qualify GATE examination based on his/her B.Tech. degree discipline. 

Admission to the Ph.D. programme in various University Schools of Study and Centres of Excellence in the University shall be through a Ph.D. Entrance Test (PET) conducted by the University. Those students, who have qualified UGC-NET (including JRF)**/UGC-CSIR NET (including JRF)**/GATE*/DBT-JRF/ICMR-JRF/Teacher fellowship holder or have passed M.Phil. programme, shall be exempted from the entrance test conducted by the University for admission to the Ph.D. programme.

Laboratories

The Institute have air conditioned modern laboratories with advanced PCs powered by high speed internet connectivity and hardware kits for hands-on-training. Visit the link to know about offered LABs.

Campus

Main Campus

The main campus of Guru Gobind Singh Indraprastha University is situated in Sector-16,  Dwarka, Delhi. The campus is spread over more than 60 acres surrounded with scenic greenery .The nearest metro station 'Sector-14 Dwarka' is just 1.5 kms from campus and is located just 15 kms from IGI Airport.

Academic Block

Equipped with most of the modern facilities Institute is located in E-Block of main campus. Block is a six storey well designed building accessible with stairs and lifts as well, making the block specially abled friendly and comfortable for all ages.

Library

The Institute have two storey air conditioned modern central library situated at the heart of the university campus.

Amenities

• Sports Ground

• Basketball Courts 

• Badminton Court

• Volleyball Court 

• Swimming Pool

• University Canteen

• Cafeterias 

• Bank 

• Hostel Accommodation 

• Staff Quarters

Student Life

See also
List of courses and colleges affiliated with GGSIPU
Education in Delhi

References

 *^"Vice-Chancellor,  Guru Gobind Singh Indraprastha University". ipu.ac.in 
 ^"Admission Brochure 2022-2023, Guru Gobind Singh Indraprastha University". 
 ^"Admission Portal, Guru Gobind Singh Indraprastha University". 
 ^"University Central Library, Guru Gobind Singh Indraprastha University". 
 ^"Main Campus-Dwarka, University Campus, Guru Gobind Singh Indraprastha University". 
 ^"list of programs offered in different discipline-USICT, Guru Gobind Singh Indraprastha University". 
 ^"Scheme_Syllabus-USICT, Guru Gobind Singh Indraprastha University".

External links

Constituent schools of Guru Gobind Singh Indraprastha University
Educational institutions established in 1999
Information technology schools in India
Engineering colleges in Delhi
1999 establishments in Delhi